Áurea Carolina de Freitas e Silva (born 20 November 1983) is a Brazilian politician, political scientist and sociologist. Although born in Pará, she has spent her political career representing Minas Gerais, having served as federal deputy representative since 2019.

Personal life
Carolina holds a degree in social sciences from the Federal University of Minas Gerais, a specialist degree in gender and equality from the Autonomous University of Barcelona, and a master's degree in political science from the Federal University of Minas Gerais.

In March 2019, Carolina was recognized as one of the 100 most influential black Brazilians in politics.

She identifies as an Afro-Brazilian, Marxist, feminist, and supporter of LGBT rights.

Political career
Carolina was the most voted candidate in the 2016 election for the council of Belo Horizonte, receiving 17,420 votes.

Carolina was elected to the federal chamber of deputies in the 2018 election, the fifth most voted candidate in the state of Minas Gerais, with 162,740 votes.

References

1983 births
Living people
People from Pará
Brazilian political scientists
Brazilian sociologists
Brazilian Marxists
Autonomous University of Barcelona alumni
Socialism and Liberty Party politicians
Members of the Chamber of Deputies (Brazil) from Minas Gerais
Members of the Legislative Assembly of Minas Gerais
Brazilian LGBT rights activists
Brazilian politicians of African descent
Afro-Brazilian feminists
Brazilian women in politics
Women political scientists